Karpukkarasi is a 1957 Indian Tamil-language swashbuckler film directed by A. S. A. Sami and produced by M. Somasundaram under Jupiter Pictures. The story and screenplay were written by A. S. A. Sami and Aru. Ramanathan. The dialogues were written by Siva-Sundaram. The film stars Gemini Ganesan, M. N. Nambiar, R. Balasubramaniam, and K. A. Thangavelu, with G. Varalakshmi, M. K. Radha, Savitri E. V. Saroja and M. Saroja in supporting roles.

Cast 

Male cast
 Gemini Ganesan as Prathaban
 M. N. Nambiar as Jagaveeran
 M. K. Radha as Vajarapuri King
 K. A. Thangavelu as Chilamban
 R. Balasubramanyam as the wizard
 P. S. Venkatachalam as Sachithananda Yogi
 P. B. Rangachari as Sage

Female cast
 K. Savithri as Manjula
 G. Varalakshmi as Chandrika
 E. V. Saroja as Sasikala
 K. R. Chellam as Singari
 M. Saroja as Pankajam
 S. Revathi as Magical Queen
 S. Mohana as Mohana

Dance
 Sayee
 Subbulakshmi
 Ragini
 Kantha

Production 
One scene required Ganesan to throw a knife at Nambiar. He did so, but the director had not called for "action" when Nambiar saw something come straight at him like a "bat out of hell". Nambiar had only one second to turn his head as the knife grazed his eye and impaled itself on the wall, leaving Nambiar with a permanent black spot on the eye. Ganesan had thrown the knife long before the shot was supposed to roll, only to impress two women who had walked on to the set.

Soundtrack 
Music was by G. Ramanathan and lyrics were written by Pattukkottai Kalyanasundaram, Kannadasan, A. Maruthakasi and Udumalai Narayana Kavi.

References

External links 

 

1957 films
1950s Tamil-language films
Indian black-and-white films
Films scored by G. Ramanathan
1950s historical romance films
Indian feminist films
Indian historical fantasy films
Indian historical romance films
Jupiter Pictures films